Knocknafallia is a 668 m (2,192 ft) high mountain in County Waterford, Ireland.

Geography 
Knocknafallia is part of the Knockmealdown Mountains and is the third highest mountain there.

See also 

Lists of mountains in Ireland
List of mountains of the British Isles by height
List of Marilyns in the British Isles
List of Hewitt mountains in England, Wales and Ireland

References

Hewitts of Ireland
Marilyns of Ireland
Mountains and hills of County Waterford
Mountains under 1000 metres